Willy Westra van Holthe ( – ) was a Dutch footballer. He was part of the Netherlands national football team, playing 4 matches and scoring 1 goal. He played his first match on 24 March 1913.

See also
 List of Dutch international footballers

References

1888 births
1965 deaths
Dutch footballers
Netherlands international footballers
People from Assen

Association footballers not categorized by position
Achilles 1894 players
Footballers from Drenthe